Åmdalsøyra or Omdalsøyra is a village in Arendal municipality in Agder county, Norway, along the Tromøysundet strait on the northern shore of the island of Tromøy. The village of Kongshavn lies just to the southwest of Åmdalsøyra, and the village of Eydehavn lies just across the strait on the mainland.

References

Arendal
Villages in Agder